There have been three baronetcies created for persons with the surname Carew, two in the Baronetage of England prior to 1707, one in the Baronetage of Great Britain.

Carew baronets, of Antony; created 1641, extinct 1799
In August 1641, Charles I sold a number of baronetcies, to raise funds; one of these was the Carew Baronetcy, of Antony in Cornwall, was purchased by Richard Carew, Member of Parliament for Cornwall and St Michael's. His son and second baronet, Sir Alexander, was executed for treason in December 1644, but succeeded by his son Sir John Carew, 3rd Baronet, MP for Cornwall, Bodmin, Lostwithiel and Saltash. The title became extinct in 1799.
Sir Richard Carew, 1st Baronet (–1643)
Sir Alexander Carew, 2nd Baronet (1609–1644)
Sir John Carew, 3rd Baronet (1635–1692)
Sir Richard Carew, 4th Baronet (1683–1703)
Sir William Carew, 5th Baronet (1690–1744)
Sir Coventry Carew, 6th Baronet (c. 1716–1748)
Sir John Carew, 7th Baronet (1708–1762)
Sir Alexander Carew, 8th Baronet (1715–1799)

Carew baronets, of Haccombe; created 1661, extant
The Carew Baronetcy, of Haccombe in the County of Devon, was created in the Baronetage of England on 2 August 1661 for Thomas Carew, Member of Parliament for Tiverton. Like the Dukes of Leinster and Earls of Plymouth, The Carews claim descent from Walter FitzOther, Castellan of Windsor in 1078. Charles Carew, grandson of Reverend Thomas Carew, younger son of the sixth Baronet, sat as Member of Parliament for Tiverton. Patrick Henry Curtis Carew (b. 1931), great-grandson of Thomas Carew (1810–1876), third son of the seventh Baronet, is a Brigadier-General in the Royal Canadian Dragoons.
Sir Thomas Carew, 1st Baronet (1632–1673)
Sir Henry Carew, 2nd Baronet (c. 1654–1695)
Sir Henry Darrell Carew, 3rd Baronet (c. 1687-c. 1707)
Sir Thomas Carew, 4th Baronet (c. 1692-c. 1746)
Sir John Carew, 5th Baronet (c. 1726-c. 1770)
Sir Thomas Carew, 6th Baronet (c. 1755–1805)
Sir Henry Carew, 7th Baronet (1779–1830)
Sir Walter Palk Carew, 8th Baronet (1807–1874)
Sir Henry Palk Carew, 9th Baronet (1870–1934)
Sir Thomas Palk Carew, 10th Baronet (1890–1976)
Sir Rivers Verain Carew, 11th Baronet (born 1935)

The heir apparent to the baronetcy is Gerald De Redvers Carew (born 1975), second but eldest living son of the 11th Baronet.

Carew baronets, of Beddington; created 1715, extinct 1762
The Carew Baronetcy, of Beddington in the County of Surrey, was created in the Baronetage of Great Britain on 11 January 1715 for Nicholas Carew, Member of Parliament for Haslemere and Surrey. The title became extinct on the death of his son, the second Baronet, in 1762.
Sir Nicholas Carew, 1st Baronet (1687–1727)
Sir Nicholas Hacket Carew, 2nd Baronet (c. 1716 – 1762)

Notes

References

Sources
 Kidd, Charles, Williamson, David (editors). Debrett's Peerage and Baronetage (1990 edition). New York: St Martin's Press, 1990.
 

 
1641 establishments in England
1799 disestablishments in England
1661 establishments in England
1715 establishments in Great Britain
1762 disestablishments in Great Britain
Baronetcies in the Baronetage of England
Extinct baronetcies in the Baronetage of England
Extinct baronetcies in the Baronetage of Great Britain